Kawajiri (written: 川尻 or 河尻) is a Japanese surname. Notable people with the surname include:

, Japanese samurai
, Japanese mixed martial artist
, Japanese animator, anime director and screenwriter

See also
Kawajiri, Hiroshima, a former town in Toyota District, Hiroshima Prefecture, Japan

Japanese-language surnames